Chaitén is a Chilean town, commune and former capital of the Palena Province in Los Lagos Region. The town is north of the mouth of Yelcho River, on the east coast of the Gulf of Corcovado. The town is strategically close to the northern end of the Carretera Austral, where the highway goes inland. The Desertores Islands are part of the commune.

Evacuation

The town was evacuated in May 2008 when the Chaitén volcano erupted for the first time in more than 9,000 years. During 2005 small earthquakes occurred below Chaitén and the nearby Liquiñe-Ofqui Fault Zone.

Over the subsequent weeks, the river excavated a new course through Chaitén, completely destroying a significant part of it by July 2008. This process is still ongoing; it is unclear how extensive the damage will ultimately be. Some defensive work has been undertaken by the government, but they ultimately decided to abandon the town, relocating and compensating all residents. The provincial capital was provisionally moved to Futaleufú after the eruption breakout, but the capital shift was later on declared permanent. The future of the town has become a matter of political controversy in Chile.

Reconstruction of Chaitén
On March 3, 2009, construction work on the new town's administrative facilities started.

On April 9, 2011, president Sebastián Piñera announced a program to rebuild the town on its existing northern area, reversing plans by the previous administration to move the town to a different location farther north.

Nearby attractions
Nearby attractions include:
Corcovado National Park, which includes Corcovado volcano
Pumalín Park, which includes Michinmahuida volcano
Yelcho Lake
Carretera Austral
Futaleufu River

References

Communes of Chile
Capitals of Chilean provinces
Populated places established in 1933
Ghost towns in South America
Former populated places in Chile
Populated places in Palena Province
Natural disaster ghost towns
1933 establishments in Chile
Coasts of Los Lagos Region